Kyle Carr (born January 21, 1995) is an American soccer player who plays as a midfielder for Chattanooga FC in the National Independent Soccer Association.

Career
Carr played 2018 with Lansing United in the team's first season in the Premier Developmental League. Following the season and United's folding, Carr was signed to his first professional contract by Lansing Ignite FC ahead of the team's first season in the newly established USL League One. The team ceased operations following the 2019 season.

On February 27, 2020, Chattanooga FC announced it had signed Carr ahead of the team's first professional season in the National Independent Soccer Association.

Career statistics

Honors
 Michigan Milk Cup: 2018

References

External links
 
 Kyle Carr at USL League Two
 
 Profile at Taylor University Athletics
 Profile at Eastern Florida State College Athletics
 Profile at Liberty University Athletics

1995 births
Living people
American soccer players
Association football midfielders
Lansing Ignite FC players
Chattanooga FC players
EFSC Titans men's soccer players
Liberty Flames men's soccer players
USL League One players
USL League Two players
National Independent Soccer Association players
Soccer players from Florida
People from Indialantic, Florida